Efe Tatlı (born 19 July 2002) is a Turkish professional footballer who plays as a midfielder for Fatih Karagümrük.

Professional career
Tatlı began his youth career with various academies in Turkey, with a brieft stint with Galatasaray in 2018, before moving to  Fatih Karagümrük's academy. Tatlı signed his first professional contract with Fatih Karagümrük in 2019. He debuted with Fatih Karagümrük in a 3–1 TFF First League win over Bursaspor on 17 August 2019. His club was promoted to the Süper Lig, and Tatlı made his professional debut in a 1–1 Süper Lig tie with Galatasaray on 10 April 2021.

References

External links
 
 
 

2002 births
Living people
People from Gaziosmanpaşa
Turkish footballers
Turkey youth international footballers
Fatih Karagümrük S.K. footballers
Süper Lig players
TFF First League players
Association football midfielders